Ilija Aračić (born 15 November 1970) is a Croatian football coach and a former player who played as a striker.

Club career
Aračić was born in Slavonski Brod, SR Croatia, SFR Yugoslavia. Coming from a sporting family, he started his footballing career as a 9-year-old at Croatian team NK Ukrina Novo Selo, before moving aged 14 to the team his father Anto played for professionally at the time, NK Polet Bosanski Brod. He later played for his local team where he was spotted by scouts of Prva HNL side NK Rijeka. Aračić, a drafter by trade, left Croatia as a result of the War of Independence, signed for Chemnitzer FC in Germany before transferring to Tennis Borussia Berlin in the summer of 1997. During the 1998–99 season, after impressing Hertha BSC with his two goals against them in the DFB-Pokal, quickly signed for TeBe's fellow West Berlin rivals where he played for one and a half years before moving to Arminia Bielefeld and seeing out the twilight of his playing career.

Post-playing career
In 2004 Aračić took over as coach of FC Augsburg's youth team. On 1 January 2012, he became head coach of the under-19 team of VfB Stuttgart. Aračić moved to FV Illertissen in 2016. In January 2018 he returned to VfB Stuttgart and became assistant coach of Tayfun Korkut.

References

External links
 
 

1970 births
Living people
Sportspeople from Slavonski Brod
Croatian footballers
Association football forwards
Bundesliga players
2. Bundesliga players
HNK Rijeka players
Chemnitzer FC players
Tennis Borussia Berlin players
Hertha BSC players
Arminia Bielefeld players
Croatian expatriate footballers
Expatriate footballers in Germany
Croatian expatriate sportspeople in Germany
FC Augsburg non-playing staff
VfB Stuttgart non-playing staff
Hertha BSC non-playing staff
Croatian expatriate sportspeople in Russia